Carrols may refer to:
 Carrols Restaurant Group, largest franchisee of Burger King 
 Carrols (Finland), former franchise of original US Carrols chain
 Carrolls, Washington, an unincorporated community